Jafferkhanpet is a locality of Chennai, India. 

Neighbourhoods in Chennai